Lior Wildikan (born 21 July 1989) is an Israeli judoka.

She won the silver medal at the 2013 Judo Grand Prix Almaty and placed 7th at the 2015 World Judo Championships.

References

External links

 
 

1989 births
Living people
Israeli female judoka
Jewish martial artists
Jewish Israeli sportspeople
Israeli female athletes
Israeli Jews
European Games competitors for Israel
Judoka at the 2015 European Games